The 2001–02 Kent Football League season was the 36th in the history of Kent Football League a football competition in England.

League table

The league featured 15 clubs which competed in the previous season, along with one new club:
Maidstone United, joined from the Kent County League

Also, Hythe United changed name to Hythe Town.

League table

References

External links

2001-02
2001–02 in English football leagues